Sapaga is a village in the Zorgho Department of Ganzourgou Province in central Burkina Faso. The village has a population of 3,316.

References

Populated places in the Plateau-Central Region
Ganzourgou Province